Platja des Niu Blau is a beach in the south east seaboard of the Spanish island of Ibiza.

Description
 Platja des Niu Blau is a small beach in a cove on the eastern outskirts of the town of  Santa Eulària des Riu. The beach has a backdrop of pine trees and the water is shallow and clear. The cove is at the mouth of the seasonal river called Torrent d'Arabí. The name Niu Blau means Blue Nest and derives from the name of a small house which stood on this bay in the 1930s.

The Blue Nest
Niu Blau or Blue Nest was a small dwelling built on the cove by the Valencian impressionist artist Rigoberto Soler for himself and his girlfriend Pilar, a model. Soler painted many works featuring the landscape around Santa Eulària des Riu its environment.

Gallery

References

Beaches of Ibiza
Santa Eulària des Riu
Beaches of the Balearic Islands